The Sisterhood of the Holy Nativity (SHN) is an Anglican religious order for women founded in 1882 by Charles Chapman Grafton SSJE. Three sisters and six novices of the Society of St. Margaret (SSM), associated with the Cowley Fathers, left SSM in 1882 to establish the new order. Sister Ruth Margaret Vose (1826-1910) was its first mother superior. The order was incorporated in Wisconsin on May 29, 1921, and remains active in the Episcopal Diocese of Fond du Lac.

Sister Abigail assumed office as reverend mother in 2012. The sisterhood's bishop visitor is the Right Rev. Matthew Gunter, Bishop of Fond du Lac.

Houses, daughter houses, and parochial ministries
Portland, Maine
Providence, Rhode Island (1888-1983), motherhouse 1888-1906
Newport, Rhode Island at the Zabriskie Memorial Church of St. John the Evangelist
New York, New York (1909-1965) at Church of St. Mary the Virgin (Manhattan)
Philadelphia, Pennsylvania at S. Clement's Church, the Church of the Annunciation, and St. Timothy's Episcopal Church, Roxborough
Baltimore, Maryland at Mount Calvary Church
Santa Barbara, California (1952-2013)
Fond du Lac, Wisconsin Convent of the Holy Nativity (1905-1999), burned 2019, demolished 2021
Oneida Nation of Wisconsin, Green Bay
Ripon, Wisconsin, Bethlehem-by-the-Lake, 1999—present

References
Sisterhood of the Holy Nativity from A. Parker Curtiss, History of the Diocese of Fond du Lac and Its Several Congregations (1925)

External links
Sisterhood of the Holy Nativity Records, 1882-1976
New Mission in West Virginia for Sisters of the Holy Nativity (1999)
150 Years on George Street, 2019 parish history of S. Stephen's Church (Providence, Rhode Island)
Convent of the Holy Nativity

Anglican orders and communities
Religious organizations established in 1882
Christian religious orders established in the 19th century
1882 establishments in Massachusetts